Rip It is an American brand of energy drink that is produced and distributed by National Beverage Corp., maker of Shasta, Faygo, and La Croix. It was introduced in 2004 and is National Beverage Corp.'s first energy drink.

Marketed as "energy fuel at a price you can swallow," Rip It drinks have been referred to as a "bare-budget option", often costing $1 per can in the United States. They have been supplied to US military personnel  serving in Afghanistan and Iraq and have gained popularity there.

Flavors and ingredients 
The drinks come in a variety of flavors (13 different ones as of 2020). There are sugar-free versions of some flavors as well as 2 fl oz shots. Some flavors are available in both 16 and 8 fl oz cans.

The drink contains 160% daily value of vitamin C, 240% daily value of vitamin B6, and 830% daily value of vitamin B12 per 16 fl oz serving according to product packaging (purchase date: 2020-11-24). It also contains taurine, caffeine, inositol, and guarana seed extract. Sugar-free versions contain sucralose and acesulfame potassium. Rip It drinks average about 160 mg of caffeine per 16 fl oz can, with the Le-MOAN’R flavor containing 204 mg of caffeine. The 2 fl oz shot versions contain about 100 mg of caffeine, with some flavors containing as much as 135 mg.

Sponsoring 
In 2020, the brand sponsored the 100Talk Podcast, aimed fans of 100 Thieves esports. They previously sponsored Olympic champion alpine skier Julia Mancuso in 2010 and the No. 16 car in the Automobile Racing Club of America driven by Joey Coulter in 2012.

Support of U.S. military 
The drink is popular and was widely consumed by U.S. forces in Afghanistan and Iraq. In a 2016 interview, an Army staff sergeant noted that "over three-quarters of military personnel are drinking this stuff on the regular". The brand highlights its support for the United States Military in its marketing.

References

External links
 

Energy drinks
American soft drinks